Rashk-e Vosta (also Romanized as Rashk-e Vosţá; also known as Rashk-e Mīān and Rashk-e Vasaţ) is a village in Toghrol Al Jerd Rural District, Toghrol Al Jerd District, Kuhbanan County, Kerman Province, Iran. At the 2006 census, its population was 197, in 51 families.

References 

Populated places in Kuhbanan County